Kimsa Chata (Aymara and Quechua kimsa three, Pukina chata mountain, "three mountains", Hispanicized spelling Quimsachata) is a group of three mountains in the Wansu mountain range in the Andes of Peru. It is situated in the Arequipa Region, La Unión Province, Huaynacotas District. Kimsa Chata lies at the Yana Wanaku valley ("black guanaco", Yanahuanaco) southeast of Hatun Pata.

References 

Mountains of Peru
Mountains of Arequipa Region